boysetsfire is an American post-hardcore band from Newark, Delaware. Formed in October 1994, boysetsfire is composed of guitarists Chad Istvan and Josh Latshaw, vocalist Nathan Gray, and bassists Chris Rakus and Robert Ehrenbrand. Their lyrical themes are politically-driven.

Biography

Boysetsfire released their first demo albums in late 1994 and early 1995. In 1996 the band released their first EP, This Crying, This Screaming, My Voice Is Being Born. In 1997, they signed a contract with Initial Records, and recorded their first album, The Day the Sun Went Out.

In 1999, their second album, After the Eulogy was recorded, and boysetsfire went on tour with Snapcase, as well as on Vans Warped tour. Also, boysetsfire released a split-EP with Snapcase in 1999, as well as the Crush 'Em All Vol. 1 Metallica tribute with Shai Hulud for Undecided Records, and another with Coalesce in 2000. Their former bassist was replaced by Rob Avery. After being signed to Victory Records, the band moved to Wind-Up, an independent label distributed by Sony in the US. Tomorrow Come Today was then released in 2003.

Following a dispute with Wind-up, in 2005 the band signed to the independent record labels Burning Heart Records for worldwide distribution and Equal Vision Records for North American distribution. The album The Misery Index: Notes from the Plague Years got released in March 2006.

Brief hiatus
On July 31, 2006, the band informed the fans about its retirement through their official website. There was a farewell European tour in late summer; however, guitarist Josh Latshaw severely injured himself prior to its start. As a result, the band played those shows with roadie Chris "The Reverend" Rakus at the guitar instead, but returned to Europe in May 2007 to give Latshaw the chance to say goodbye to the European fans.

The band's final performance took place on June 9, 2007 in Philadelphia, Pennsylvania at the Trocadero Theatre. A DVD has been released of this show in its entirety as well as parts of the final European tour.

On February 12, 2007, lead vocalist Nathan Gray announced that he was forming a new band by the name of The Casting Out. While the band includes several former members of boysetsfire, Gray informed fans that it would not be another political band.

Drummer Matt Krupanski went on to form new bands Bound and Buried and Young Lady, the latter which included future boysetsfire bassist, Marc Krupanski (formerly of Dear Tonight, Midvale, Eldritch Anisette, Dorian Gray, and Network 34) as well as two other Delaware natives, including members from Joshua Fit for Battle.

Reunion
boysetsfire announced their reunion on their website and official Facebook-page on October 5, 2010. Tour venues were Berlin, the Groezrock Festival in Belgium, the Studio at Webster Hall and the Nova Rock Festival in Nickelsdorf, Austria. In August 2011, they played in the UK at the Reading & Leeds Festival. In November 2011, via the band's official Facebook page, the band announced Robert Ehrenbrand had left the band. The band then announced that Marc Krupanski (from a number of former bands, such as "Dear Tonight", "Midvale", and "Eldritch Anisette") officially joined as the new bassist.

The band recorded 5 new songs in the summer of 2012 with two of them scheduled to be released on Magic Bullet Records as a vinyl 7" record.
In 2012, five shows were played in the U.S.: two in January 2012 (one in their hometown of Newark, Delaware and the other in West Chester, Pennsylvania), one in Boston, one in Providence, one and at The Bamboozle Festival in Asbury Park, New Jersey in May 2012. They then conducted a three-week tour in July–August 2012 in Europe. In December 2012 via the band's official Facebook page, it was announced that both Matt and Marc Krupanski had left the band. A few days later, it was announced that Chris Rakus and Robert Ehrenbrand would share bass player duties. Dan Pelic joined as drummer.

In June 2013, the band released a two-song EP featuring brothers Matt and Marc Krupanski, as well as a fifth album, While a Nation Sleeps..., which featured new and previously unreleased songs re-recorded by Dan Pelic and Robert Ehrenbrand. It was well-received, especially in the German album charts where it reached #22. A European Tour was carried out in June and July 2013, including concerts at Hurricane and Southside Festival, with additional shows being played in Dortmund, Stuttgart and Hamburg in October 2013. In November and December 2013, the band toured Australia and in April 2014 gave concerts in the UK. The band returned to Europe for summer and in celebration of its 20th anniversary, announced shows in Hamburg, Cologne, Berlin and Vienna in October 2014.

In September 2015, the band released their self-titled sixth album. This was followed by a European tour to support the album with Silverstein and Great Collapse. In Summer 2016, they will be going on a European tour with Polar and Wolf down before taking a break in order to focus on other musical projects.

Personnel

Current members 
Nathan Gray – lead vocals, keyboard (1994–present)
Josh Latshaw – guitar, backing vocals (1994–present)
Chad Istvan – guitar, backing vocals (1994–present)
Robert Ehrenbrand – bass (2004–2011, 2013–present)
Chris Rakus – bass (2013–present)
Jared Shavelson – drums (2013–present)

Former members
Darrell Hyde – bass (1994–1999)
Rob Avery – bass (1999–2004)
Marc Krupanski – bass (2011–2013)
Matt Krupanski – drums (1994–2013)
Dan Pelic – drums (2013)
Lee Dickerson – guitar (2013)

Timeline

Discography
Over the years, boysetsfire released records through Magic Bullet, Conquer the World, Deathwish Inc, Initial, Hydra Head, Victory, Wind-Up, Equal Vision, and Burning Heart. They have released split-EPs with Coalesce, Shai Hulud, Snapcase, Funeral for a Friend, and KMPFSPRT.

Studio-albums
1997: The Day the Sun went out CD/LP
2000: After the Eulogy CD/CS/LP
2003: Tomorrow Come Today CD/DVD
2006: The Misery Index: Notes from the Plague-Years CD/DVD
2013: While a Nation Sleeps...
2015: Self-titled

EPs
1994: Boysetsfire
1995: Premonition, Change, Revolt
1996: Consider
1996: This Crying, this Screaming, my Voice is being born
1998: In Chrysalis
1999: Snapcase vs. Boysetsfire (split)
2000: Crush 'Em All Vol. 1 (Boysetsfire/Shai Hulud split)
2000: Coalesce / Boysetsfire (split)
2001: Suckerpunch Training
2013: Bled dry
2013:  The Casting-out
2014: Split 7" (Boysetsfire/Funeral For A Friend)
2015: Split 10" (Boysetsfire/KMPFSPRT)

Compilations and other appearances
1995: Dad, I Can't Breathe(Creep Records compilation)
1997: For the Kids (7" benefit compilation, including an earlier version of BSF song "With Cold Eyes". Other bands include "The Weak Link Breaks", "By the Grace of God" and "Dorian Gray" which featured other Delaware natives including future members of Boysetsfire, Rob Avery and Marc Krupanski. Released by Diffusion Records)
2003: Daredevil: The Album (soundtrack to the original motion picture, LP)
2005: Before the Eulogy (B-sides and rarities CD)

One of their songs, "Handful of Redemption", is featured on the video games Tiger Woods '03 and MVP Baseball '03 by EA Sports. Their song "Rookie" from the After the Eulogy album was featured on the Legends of Wrestling video game. "Rookie" from After the Eulogy and "Handful of Redemption" from the Tomorrow Come Today album were also featured in the video game 1080° Avalanche.  Additionally, their song "High Wire Escape Artist" is featured on the soundtrack to The Daredevil motion picture.  The soundtrack record, released by Wind-up Records, is the band's first and only gold record.

Live-recordings
2002: Live for Today (EP)
2009: Farewell Show (DVD)

Music-videos
2003: Last Year's Nest
2005: Dear George
2006: Requiem
2013: Bled dry
2013: Closure
2013: Never said
2015: One Match

References

External links

Burning Heart band information
ITunes

1994 establishments in Delaware
American post-hardcore musical groups
Burning Heart Records artists
Conquer the World Records artists
Deathwish Inc. artists
Equal Vision Records artists
Musical groups established in 1994
Rock music groups from Delaware
Undecided Records artists
Victory Records artists
End Hits Records artists